Golders Green Crematorium and Mausoleum was the first crematorium to be opened in London, and one of the oldest crematoria in Britain. The land for the crematorium was purchased in 1900, costing £6,000 (the equivalent of £135,987 in 2021), and the crematorium was opened in 1902 by Sir Henry Thompson.

Golders Green Crematorium, as it is usually called, is in Hoop Lane, off Finchley Road, Golders Green, London NW11, ten minutes' walk from Golders Green Underground station. It is directly opposite the Golders Green Jewish Cemetery (Golders Green is an area with a large Jewish population). The crematorium is secular, accepts all faiths and non-believers; clients may arrange their own type of service or remembrance event and choose whatever music they wish.

The crematorium gardens are listed at Grade I in the National Register of Historic Parks and Gardens.

History

Cremation was not legal in Great Britain until 1885. The first crematorium was built in Woking and it was successful. At that time cremation was championed by the Cremation Society of Great Britain. This society was governed by a council, at that time led by Sir Henry Thompson (president and founding member). There is a bust to his memory in the West Chapel of Golders Green Crematorium. Out of this Society was formed the London Cremation Company (which has its offices on the premises), who desired to build a crematorium within easy reach of London.

The crematorium in Golders Green was designed by the architect Sir Ernest George and his partner Alfred Yeates. The gardens were laid out by William Robinson. The crematorium is a red brick building in Lombardic style and was built in stages, as money became available. The crematorium opened in 1902 and was built in four phases (1901–1910, 1910–1911, 1912–1916, 1926–1928). By 1939, the site was largely completed, although since then some buildings have been added. Since November 1902 more than 323,500 cremations have taken place at Golders Green Crematorium, far more than any other British crematorium. It is estimated that the crematorium now averages around 2,000 cremations a year. The funerals of many prominent people have taken place there over the last century.

Ironically, the ashes of the first person cremated at Woking, Mrs Jeanette Pickersgill (died 21 April 1885), widow of artist Henry William Pickersgill, were removed from Woking to the East Columbarium at Golders Green, according to Woking's cremation records.

The chimney of the crematorium is located within the tower and the building is in an Italianate style. The  of gardens are extensively planted, and produce a beautiful and tranquil environment for visitors. There are several large tombs, two ponds and bridge, and a large crocus lawn. Another notable feature is a special children's section, which includes a swinging bench. There is also a 'communist corner' with memorials to notables of the Communist Party of Great Britain. There are two cremation chapels and a Chapel of Memory. There are also three columbaria containing the ashes of thousands of Londoners and residents of neighbouring counties.

There have been 14 holders of the Victoria Cross cremated here, and there are locations and memorials for many other military personnel of all ranks, and from many countries.
Largest among them is the Commonwealth War Graves Commission memorial, commemorating 496 British and Commonwealth military casualties of both World Wars who were cremated here. Designed by Sir Edward Maufe, it was unveiled in 1952. Built in Portland stone with names listed on three bronze panels, it stands at head of an ornamental pond at the western end of the memorial cloister.

At Christmas, a Christmas tree is erected in the field in front of the main buildings. Although the crematorium is secular, a nativity scene is also placed near the Chapel of Memory.

Notable monuments
The crematorium gardens are listed at Grade I in the National Register of Historic Parks and Gardens. The Philipson Family mausoleum, designed by Edwin Lutyens, is a Grade II* listed building on the National Heritage List for England and the crematorium building, the wall, along with memorials and gates, the Martin Smith Mausoleum and Into The Silent Land, a sculpture by Henry Alfred Pegram are all Grade II listed buildings. The largest sculpture portraying someone cremated here is the statue of Indian industrialist and friend of Gandhi, Ghanshyam Das Birla.

Visiting
A map of the Garden of Rest and some information on persons cremated here is available from the office. Staff are available to help in finding a specific location. This service is £10 per request. The columbaria can be visited. There is also a tea room.

Notable cremations

Ashes at Golders Green Crematorium
Among those whose ashes are retained or were scattered here, are:

 Larry Adler, American harmonica player
 Kingsley Amis, British writer, one of the Angry young men
 Boris Anrep, Russian artist
 Pegaret Anthony, British artist
 Sir Fenton Aylmer, 13th Baronet, British soldier, VC recipient
 Sir Edward Battersby Bailey, geologist
 Lionel Bart, composer of Oliver! and many other shows and songs
 Edith Rosenbaum, First Class survivor of the sinking of RMS Titanic
 Ronnie Biggs, criminal and participant of The Great Train Robbery of 1963
 Eric Blom, British musicologist
 Simon Blumenfeld, writer and columnist
 Enid Blyton, children's author (Famous Five, Noddy)
 Marc Bolan, musician, poet and writer (founder of T. Rex)
 Bernard Bresslaw, Carry On film series actor
 Arthur Brough, actor
 George Brown, Baron George-Brown, Labour party politician, ultimately Foreign Secretary.
 Jack Bruce, Scottish composer, musician and member of Cream
 Mrs Victor Bruce, racing motorist, speedboat racer and aviator
 Bella Burge, music hall performer and boxing promoter
 Sir Neville Cardus, notable cricket writer, also distinguished music critic
 Eric Coates, English composer of light music
 Leslie Compton, English footballer and cricketer
 Steve Conway, singer
 Cicely Courtneidge, actress and comedian
 Walter Crane, English artist and book illustrator
 Tony Crombie, English jazz musician
 Victor Dandré, Russian impresario and husband of Anna Pavlova
 Ed Devereaux, Australian actor
 James Dewar, British chemist and physicist (inventor of the Dewar flask or vacuum flask)
 Edith Durham, writer, traveller and anthropologist
 Ray Ellington, English musician
 Havelock Ellis, intellectual
 Dame Millicent Fawcett, leader of the suffragist movement
 Kathleen Ferrier, British singer (there is a rosebed in her memory)
 Molly Fink, Australian socialite and wife of Marthanda Bhairava Tondaiman of Pudukkottai.
 Bud Flanagan, singer and Crazy Gang star
 George Frampton, British sculptor
 Lynne Frederick, actress
 Anna Freud, daughter of Sigmund Freud, also a psychoanalyst, especially of children
 Sigmund and Martha Freud, father of modern psychoanalysis and his wife
 Ernest George, English architect (and who designed this crematorium with Alfred Yeates)
 Simon Gipps-Kent, English actor, Crocus Lawn, Section 3H
 Elinor Glyn, English romantic novelist and scriptwriter.
 Ernő Goldfinger, Hungarian born architect and designer of furniture
 Charles Gray, English actor
 Hughie Green, Canadian born quiz show host
 Arthur Greenwood, English Labour politician. (Ashes and memorial, Bay 17 of the East Boundary Wall.)
 Joyce Grenfell, actress and comedian
 John Gross, writer
 Irene Handl, actress and comedian
 Tommy Handley, British comedian
 Robert Harbin, South African born magician and writer
 Sir Cedric Hardwicke, English actor
 Jack Hawkins, actor
 Tubby Hayes, English jazz musician
 Ian Hendry, actor
 Patrick Hennessy, Irish Realist Artist
 Dezo Hoffmann, Slovak photographer of actors and rock stars including the Beatles
 Henry Holland, 1st Viscount Knutsford, British Conservative politician
 Lady Margaret Huggins and her husband Sir William Huggins, astronomers
 Ralph Ince, American film actor, director and screenwriter
 Gordon Jackson, actor
 Alex James, footballer
 Sid James, South African actor for both Bless This House and Carry On film series star
 Sir Geoffrey Alan Jellicoe, architect
 Jimmy Jewel, comedian
 Yootha Joyce, actress
 Geoffrey Keen, actor
 Albert William Ketèlbey, English composer, conductor and pianist
 Johnny Kidd, singer
 Sir Alexander Korda, Hungarian-born film producer
 David Kossoff, actor, writer, and campaigner
 Paul Kossoff, musician (guitarist with Free, among others)
 Alfred Lawrence, 1st Baron Trevethin, former Lord Chief Justice of England, drowned in fishing accident.
 Doris Lessing, writer, 2007 Nobel Prize in Literature laureate
 Percy Wyndham Lewis, artist and writer
 William Howard Livens, military engineer and inventor
 Wolf Mankowitz, British playwright and screenwriter
 Karl Mannheim, Hungarian-born British sociologist, founder of the sociology of knowledge
 Moore Marriott, British comic actor
 Mary Millar, British actress and singer
 Marthanda Bhairava Tondaiman, Raja of Pudukkottai 1886–1928
 Keith Moon, musician (drummer for The Who)
 Janet Munro, actress, wife of actor Ian Hendry (above)
 Alexander Murray, 8th Earl of Dunmore, British soldier, politician and VC winner
 Ivor Novello, actor, writer and lyricist
 Seán O'Casey, Irish playwright
 Joe Orton, playwright
 Val Parnell, impresario
 Anna Pavlova, Russian ballerina
 Harry Pollitt, General Secretary of the British Communist Party
 Marie Rambert, ballerina and founder of Rambert Dance Company
 William Rust, Communist activist, editor of The Daily Worker
 Peter Schidlof, Austrian-British violist
 Ronnie Scott, British jazz musician
 Phil Seamen, British jazz musician
 Peter Sellers, actor and comedian
 Geoffrey Shaw composer
 Ella Shields, Music Hall artiste and male impersonator. Singer of Burlington Bertie.
 Kathleen Simon, Viscountess Simon, abolitionist
 Bernard Spilsbury, pathologist
 Bram Stoker, Irish writer (Dracula)
 John Stride, actor
 A.J.P. Taylor, historian
 Sir Henry Thompson, 1st Baronet, surgeon and founder of the Cremation Society of England
 Karl Tunberg, American screenwriter, author and film producer; past-President WGA, West (US)
 Tommy Vance, British broadcaster
 Conrad Veidt, German actor, following cremation in the US
 Vesta Victoria, music hall performer
 Barbara Windsor, Carry On film series, EastEnders actress
 Bernie Winters, comedian
 Maurice Woodruff, English clairvoyant, following cremation in Singapore

Ashes taken elsewhere after cremation
Among those cremated here, but whose ashes are elsewhere, are:

 Dame Peggy Ashcroft, actress, ashes scattered in the Great Garden at New Place, Stratford-upon-Avon, Warwickshire
 Arnold Bennett, novelist, ashes buried at Burslem Cemetery, Staffordshire
 Ernest Bevin, British Labour politician, ashes removed to Westminster Abbey
 Sir Alfred Billson (1839–1907), Liberal MP, ashes buried at Kensal Green Cemetery.
 Hypatia Bradlaugh Bonner, daughter of Charles Bradlaugh, atheist and freethinking author and peace campaigner, ashes buried in Brookwood Cemetery.
 Horatio Bottomley, British Liberal, later Independent, M.P., journalist, swindler, ashes scattered on Sussex Downs
 Brendan Bracken, 1st Viscount Bracken, Irish born British Conservative politician ashes scattered on Romney Marshes.
 Neville Chamberlain, British Conservative politician and Prime Minister, ashes removed to Westminster Abbey
 Alan J. Charig, British Palaeontologist, ashes scattered with his wife’s at Woldingham Viewpoint near Oxted, Surrey.
 Peter Cook, British actor and comedian, ashes buried in an unmarked plot behind St. John's Church in Hampstead.
 Bebe Daniels, American actress, singer and writer, with her husband, Ben Lyon, at the Hollywood Forever Cemetery, Hollywood
 Ian Dury, English singer-lyricist, best known for No. 1 hit "Hit Me with Your Rhythm Stick", his ashes have reputedly been scattered in the Thames, there is a memorial bench in Richmond Park
 T. S. Eliot, Anglo-American poet, playwright, and literary critic, ashes in St Michael's Church in East Coker, Somerset
 Lily Elsie, actress (location of ashes unknown)
 Barry Evans, English actor (location of ashes unknown)
 John Fisher, 1st Baron Fisher, Admiral of the Fleet, ashes buried at Kilverstone, Norfolk.
 John French, 1st Earl of Ypres, Field Marshal, ashes buried at Ripple, Kent.
 Sir Edward German, composer, ashes buried at Whitchurch, Shropshire.
 David Gest, Music producer, Comedian and Television personality. Funeral service held at Golders Green Crematorium on 29 April 2016, His ashes were scattered in York.
 W. S. Gilbert, dramatist and author, who with Arthur Sullivan wrote the Savoy operas, ashes buried at the Church of St. John the Evangelist, Stanmore.
 Sir Charles Henry, expatriate Australian businessman and Liberal Member of Parliament (MP) in the British Parliament, ashes buried Willesden Jewish Cemetery.
 Richard Hillary, Anglo-Australian RAF fighter ace, ashes scattered over English Channel. He is listed on Commonwealth War Graves Commission cremation memorial.
 Reginald Hine, British historian, ashes scattered at Minsden Chapel
 Eric Hobsbawm, British historian, ashes interred at Highgate Cemetery
 Professor Louis Hoffmann (Angelo John Lewis), author of "Modern Magic" (1876) and other books on magic, games, amusements and puzzles. Funeral service and cremation took place at Golders Green on 29 December 1919, location of ashes unknown.
 Gary Holton, actor best known as the star of Auf Wiedersehen, Pet, his ashes rest in Maesgwastad Cemetery, Welshpool, Montgomeryshire
 Kenneth Horne, comedian and businessman, star of Much-Binding-in-the-Marsh, Beyond Our Ken and Round the Horne, ashes have reputedly been moved to an unknown location
 A.E. Housman, classical scholar and poet, author of A Shropshire Lad, ashes interred outside St Laurence's Church, Ludlow, Shropshire, England
 John Inman, actor, star of Are You Being Served?, location of ashes unknown
 Henry Irving, stage actor in the Victorian era, ashes removed to Westminster Abbey
 Rufus Isaacs, 1st Marquess of Reading, Liberal politician and lawyer, ashes buried at the nearby Jewish cemetery
 Henry James, American-born British novelist, ashes buried at Cambridge, Massachusetts, U.S.A.
 Jerome K. Jerome, writer, ashes buried at St Mary's Churchyard, Ewelme, Oxfordshire
 Kenrick Hymans ("Snakehips") Johnson, Guyanese-born British jazz band leader, cremated here, ashes removed to chapel of Sir William Borlase's Grammar School, Marlow, Buckinghamshire
 Adrian Jones, sculptor of various war and other military memorials, ashes interred outside St Laurence's Church, Ludlow.
 Ernest Jones, psychoanalyst, ashes were buried in the grave of the oldest of his four children in the churchyard of St Cadoc's Cheriton on the Gower Peninsula
 Hetty King, Music Hall artiste and male impersonator.
 Rudyard Kipling, British author and poet, ashes removed to Poet's Corner, Westminster Abbey
 Leonid Krasin, Russian and Soviet Bolshevik politician and diplomat, ashes buried in the Kremlin Wall Necropolis
 Kit Lambert, manager and record producer for The Who, ashes buried at Brompton Cemetery
 Verity Lambert, television producer.
 Vivien Leigh, English actress, ashes were scattered on the lake at Tickerage Mill pond, near Blackboys, Sussex
 Alice Liddell, ashes removed to Lyndhurst, Hampshire (see Alice's Adventures in Wonderland).
 Lieutenant General Samuel Lomax, died of wounds World War I, ashes buried at Aldershot Military Cemetery
 Princess Louise, Duchess of Argyll, ashes buried at the Royal Burial Ground at Frogmore
 Princess Louise Margaret, Duchess of Connaught and Strathearn, the first member of the British Royal Family to be cremated, ashes buried at the Royal Burial Ground at Frogmore
 Edwin Lutyens, architect whose designs include The Cenotaph. Ashes buried at St Paul's Cathedral, London
 Charles Rennie Mackintosh, Scottish architect, ashes scattered at sea at Port Vendres, France.
 Matt Monro, singer, ashes removed by the family
 John Morley, 1st Viscount Morley of Blackburn, Liberal politician, ashes buried at Putney Vale Cemetery.
 Peter O'Toole, actor and author, cremated on 21 December 2013 in a wicker coffin
 Marian Cripps, Baroness Parmoor, anti-war activist, ashes taken to Frieth
 H. G. Pelissier, actor, composer and satirist, ashes rest in Marylebone Cemetery
 Admiral of the Fleet Sir Dudley Pound, ashes, with those of his wife, scattered at sea; commemorated on the Commonwealth War Graves Commission cremation memorial here.
 King Prajadhipok of Thailand, ashes removed to Chakri Throne Hall in the Grand Palace, Bangkok.
 Wendy Richard, English actress, ashes interred at East Finchley Cemetery
 Arnold Ridley, author and actor, ashes rest in Bath Abbey Cemetery
 Herbrand Russell, 11th Duke of Bedford, politician and hereditary peer, President of the Cremation Society. Ashes buried at St Michael's Church, Chenies, Buckinghamshire.
 Ernest Rutherford, 1st Baron Rutherford of Nelson, physicist, ashes removed to Westminster Abbey.
 Shapurji Saklatvala, Indian-born Labour and Communist Member of the British Parliament. Cremated here, ashes buried at the Parsi burial ground in Brookwood Cemetery.
 Richard Bowdler Sharpe, zoologist, founder of the British Ornithologists' Club and Assistant Keeper of the British Museum
 Sophia Duleep Singh (1876–1948) Indian princess and suffragette, daughter of the last Maharaja of the Punjab. Cremated here, ashes scattered in the Punjab.
 F. E. Smith, 1st Earl of Birkenhead, lawyer-statesman, ashes buried at Charlton, Northamptonshire.
 Sir Charles Villiers Stanford, composer, ashes buried in Westminster Abbey.
 Vivian Stanshall, founding member of the Bonzo Dog Doo-Dah Band, artist, poet and broadcaster. His ashes are in the possession of his wife and daughter. A memorial plaque is in the crematorium's Poets' Corner, unveiled on 13 December 2015.
 Ellen Terry, actress, ashes kept at St Paul's, Covent Garden, London
 James Henry Thomas (1874–1949), Labour cabinet minister and railwaymen's trade union leader, ashes buried at Swindon, Wiltshire.
 H. G. Wells, English author, ashes scattered at sea
 Ralph Vaughan Williams, composer, ashes buried in North Aisle, Westminster Abbey
 Amy Winehouse, singer-songwriter, ashes buried at Edgwarebury Cemetery, alongside her grandmother.
 Szmul Zygielbojm Polish-Jewish political activist. In 1943 committed suicide in London as a protest against international indifference towards Holocaust. His ashes were transferred to New York in 1961 by Zygielbojm's fellows from Bund Jewish Organization.

Gallery

References

Further reading

External links

 Commonwealth War Graves Commission (CWGC): Golders Green Crematorium
 Golders Green Crematorium at Hampstead Garden Suburb Trust
 

 
Parks and open spaces in the London Borough of Barnet
Religion in the London Borough of Barnet
Grade I listed parks and gardens in London
Grade II* listed buildings in the London Borough of Barnet
Grade II listed buildings in the London Borough of Barnet
Crematoria in England
Crematoria in London
Crematorium